Gary Reineke (born May 27, 1945) is a Canadian actor.

Early life
Reineke was born in Scarborough, Ontario on May 27, 1945.

Career
Reineke has appeared in more than eighty films since 1974, and was a Genie Award nominee for Best Supporting Actor at the 4th Genie Awards in 1983 for his performance in The Grey Fox.

Selected filmography

References

External links 

1945 births
Living people
People from Scarborough, Toronto
Canadian male film actors
Canadian male television actors
Canadian male voice actors
Male actors from Toronto